Ángel Sola Fuertes (Salillas de Jalón, 1859 - Morata de Jalón, 1910) was a Spanish musician. He is considered to be one of the greatest bandurria players of all time.

1859 births
1910 deaths
People from Valdejalón